Athena Air Services was a planned airline based in Johor Bahru, Malaysia in the early 2000s. It proposed to operate scheduled, domestic and international passenger services.

History
The airline company was established in 2003 and intended to start its operations on 18 November 2003. It was owned jointly by Athena Sdn Bhd and PT Avipatria. In 2004 it was considered by analysts as a small budget airline worth watching, with plans for expansion, but restricted by lack of a website for bookings. The airline finally ceased all operations in 2016.

Services
Athena Air Services originally projected to operate flights to Jakarta and Surabaya from Senai International Airport.

Fleet
The Athena Air Services fleet consisted of 1 Boeing 727-200.

References

Defunct airlines of Malaysia
Airlines established in 2003
Airlines disestablished in 2016
2003 establishments in Malaysia
2016 disestablishments in Malaysia
Malaysian companies established in 2003